Chen Hongjie (born 14 February 1990) is a Paralympic athlete from China competing mainly in category T46 track and field events.

He competed in the 2008 Summer Paralympics in Beijing, China.  There he won a bronze medal in the men's High jump - F44/46 event. Four years later he repeated the feat with another bronze medal at the 2012 Summer Paralympics in London.

Notes

External links
 

Paralympic athletes of China
Paralympic silver medalists for China
Paralympic bronze medalists for China
1990 births
Living people
People from Xiamen
Chinese male long jumpers
Chinese male high jumpers
Medalists at the 2008 Summer Paralympics
Medalists at the 2012 Summer Paralympics
Medalists at the 2016 Summer Paralympics
Athletes (track and field) at the 2008 Summer Paralympics
Athletes (track and field) at the 2012 Summer Paralympics
Athletes (track and field) at the 2016 Summer Paralympics
Athletes (track and field) at the 2020 Summer Paralympics
Paralympic medalists in athletics (track and field)
21st-century Chinese people
Paralympic high jumpers
Paralympic long jumpers
Medalists at the 2010 Asian Para Games
Medalists at the 2018 Asian Para Games